Justice Moody refers to William Henry Moody, associate justice of the Supreme Court of the United States. Justice Moody may also refer to:

Blair Moody Jr., associate justice of the Michigan Supreme Court
Gideon C. Moody, associate justice of the Dakota Territorial Supreme Court